Austin Way is a regional magazine published six times a year. The publication targets affluent residents of Austin, Texas and covers style, music, philanthropy, real estate, dining, art and more.

History 
Austin Way's first issue was published in September 2014. The company was formerly known as Niche Media, LLC,  which was founded by Jason Binn in 1992, and was renamed GreenGale Media. GreenGale was acquired by Modern Luxury in 2017.

References

External links
 Official website

2014 establishments in Texas
Bimonthly magazines published in the United States
Local interest magazines published in the United States
Magazines established in 2014
Magazines published in Austin, Texas